The Indooroopilly bus station, also known as the Indooroopilly Interchange, is a major TransLink bus stop servicing the western suburbs of Brisbane. The interchange forms part of the Indooroopilly Shopping Centre and is a major interchange for inner-city bus lines. It is in a transition precinct between Zone 1 and Zone 2 of the public transport system. Indooroopilly train station is located within walking distance from Indooroopilly.

Services by platform
Indooroopilly has three platforms. Platform A is mainly used for outbound services, platform B for inbound services and platform C for special-type services.

References
1. Indooroopilly Interchange Upgrade -Westfield Indooroopilly Shoppingtown bus interchange upgrade.

Bus stations in Brisbane
Indooroopilly, Queensland